The Cherokee was an experimental rocket built by the Cook Electric Co. for use by the United States Air Force during the 1950s for the testing of ejection seats.

History
Made from aluminum, Cherokee was a blocky, simple design that was designed for air-launch from a B-29 bomber. It was operated as part of Project Whoosh, an effort to determine if the use of ejection seats at supersonic speeds was feasible.

Launched from the B-29 mothership at an altitude of  it would fire a solid-fueled rocket to accelerate to supersonic speed, at which point the ejection seat, containing an anesthetized chimpanzee as a test subject, would be fired. The first test took place on January 26, 1954, at Edwards Air Force Base; another test in June was held before the project moved to Holloman Air Force Base, with two further tests being carried out in July 1955 and April 1956. None of the four chimpanzees used in the tests survived due to difficulties with the ejection system, however the project was considered a partial success.

References
Citations

Bibliography

 Burgess, Colin, and Chris Dubbs. Animals in Space: From Research Rockets to the Space Shuttle. 2006. New York: Springer Publishing. .
 Bushnell, David. History of Research in Space Biology and Biodynamics at the U.S. Air Force Missile Development Center, Holloman Air Force Base, New Mexico: 1946-1958. Historical Division, Office of Information Services, Air Force Missile Development Center, Air Research and Development Command, Holloman Air Force Base, New Mexico. 1958. Accessed 2014-05-17. .

Experimental rockets of the United States
Equipment of the United States Air Force
Ejection seats
Boeing B-29 Superfortress
Animal testing in the United States